Rakvere Tarvas are sport clubs based in Rakvere, Estonia. The name may refer to:

BC Rakvere Tarvas, Estonian basketball club
Rakvere JK Tarvas, Estonian football club